Iva Valley is a locality located in the Nigerian city of Enugu in Enugu State. The Iva Valley is named after a valley in the area which bears the same name. The locality is the site of the Iva Valley Coal Mine. The Iva Valley is famed in Enugu for the events of November 18, 1949 when 21 miners were shot dead by policemen while striking.

A detailed account of the incident was also published in the memoirs of the British Resident of Enugu at the time, James Stewart Smith.

The Iva Valley Coal Mine was opened in 1917 by the British colonial government of Nigeria after the Udi Mine in 1915, making it the second ever coal mine established in the city.

References

Enugu